Charlie Seeling , was a New Zealand professional rugby league footballer who played in the 1920s, 1930s and 1940s, and coached in the 1950s. A  he played at representative level for Dominion XIII, and at club level for Warrington (Heritage No. 331), Wigan (Heritage No. 379) (two spells, including the second as a World War II guest), Dewsbury (two spells, including the first as a World War II guest) (captain, following the transfer of; Vic Hey) and Batley and coached at club level for  amateur side Heckmondwike.

Playing career

Championship final appearances
Charlie Seeling played  in  the second leg of Dewsbury's 14-25 aggregate defeat by Wigan in the Championship Final during the 1943–44 season scoring a penalty in the 5-12 defeat at Crown Flatt, Dewsbury on Saturday 20 May 1944.

Club career
Seeling made his début for Warrington on Saturday 16 April 1927, and he played his last match for Warrington on Saturday 24 February 1934. He made his début for Wigan in the 7-9 defeat by Swinton at Station Road, Swinton on Saturday 17 March 1934, he scored his first try for Wigan in the 35-10 victory over Hull F.C. at Central Park, Wigan on Saturday 14 April 1934, he scored his last try for Wigan in the 35-5 victory over Rochdale Hornets at Central Park on Saturday 31 October 1936, and he played his last match for Wigan (in his second spell) in the 10-4 victory over Keighley at Lawkholme Lane, Keighley on Saturday 29 January 1944.

Genealogical information
Charlie Seeling Jr. was the son of the rugby union and rugby league footballer; Charlie Seeling.

References

Batley Bulldogs players
Dewsbury Rams captains
Dewsbury Rams players
Dominion XIII rugby league team players
New Zealand rugby league coaches
New Zealand rugby league players
Place of birth missing
Place of death missing
Rugby league locks
Warrington Wolves players
Wigan Warriors players
Year of birth missing
Year of death missing